The 2020 British GT Championship (known for sponsorship reasons as the 2020 Intelligent Money British GT Championship) was the 28th British GT Championship, a sports car championship promoted by the Stéphane Ratel Organisation (SRO). The season began on 2 August at Oulton Park and finished on 8 November at Silverstone, after nine races held over seven meetings.

Calendar
The season opened at Oulton Park on 2 August and ended at Silverstone on 8 November.

Entry list

GT3

GT4

Race Results
Bold indicates overall winner for each car class (GT3 and GT4).

GT3

GT4

Championship Standings
Points were awarded as follows:

Drivers' Championships

Overall

Pro-Am Cup

Silver Cup

Am Cup

Teams' Championship

1 — Car No. 33 entered as Team Tegiwa and Car Nos. 42 and 43 entered as Century Motorsport.
2 — The No. 19, No. 20 & No. 22 Balfe Motorsport cars were ineligible to score points as they weren't full season entries.
3 — The No. 11 2 Seas Motorsport car was ineligible to score points as it is not a full season entrant.
4 — The No. 3 Jenson Team Rocket RJN car was ineligible to score points as it is not a full season entrant.
5 — The No. 68 & No. 77 Optimum Motorsport cars were ineligible to score points as they weren't full season entries.
6 — The No. 16 & No. 17 Team Parker Racing cars were ineligible to score points as they weren't full season entries.

Notes

References

External links
 

British GT Championship seasons
GT Championship